Tetrasilane is a silane with the structure formula SiH3–(SiH2)2–SiH3. It is the silane analog of butane.

Preparation 
Tetrasilane can be prepared by reacting magnesium silicide (Mg2Si) with acids like 20% phosphoric acid in 50–60 °C.

The reaction can produce silanes up to n=15. The reaction of magnesium silicide with 25% hydrochloric acid produces 40% monosilane, 30% disilane, 15% trisilane, 10% tetrasilane and 5% higher silanes. The mixture can be separated by fractional distillation.

In addition, higher silanes can also be obtained by discharges monosilane:

Properties
Tetrasilane is a colourless, pyrophoric liquid that has a disgusting odour. Even below 54 °C, it will still spontaneous combust. It is even more unstable than trisilane, slowly decomposing at room temperature, releasing hydrogen and forming shorter chain silanes.

Reactions
Photochemical disproportionation of tetrasilane will produce 3-silylpentasilane and disilane.

With the presence of aluminium chloride, heating tetrasilane in xylene will allow isomerization to isotetrasilane.

References

Silanes